Diadi, officially the Municipality of Diadi, is a 4th class municipality in the province of Nueva Vizcaya, Philippines. According to the 2020 census, it has a population of 19,236 people.

History
Diadi was formerly a barangay of Bagabag. House Bill No. 182, titled "An Act Creating the Municipal District of Diadi in the Province of Nueva Vizcaya," was introduced by then-Congressman Leonardo B. Perez on February 28, 1966. It was subsequently approved by the Committee on Provincial and Municipal Governments in Committee Report No. 54. Later, in May 1967, Senator John Osmeña Jr. issued Committee Report 1053 recommending passage of the Bill. On 17 June 1967, R.A. 4973 was approved by both chambers of Congress, thus creating the Municipality of Diadi.

Geography

Barangays
Diadi is politically subdivided into 19 barangays. These barangays are headed by elected officials: Barangay Captain, Barangay Council, whose members are called Barangay Councilors. All are elected every three years [by Aireen Sison].

 Ampakleng
 Arwas
 Balete
 Bugnay
 Butao
 Decabacan
 Duruarog
 Escoting
 Langka
 Lurad
 Nagsabaran
 Namamparan
 Pinya
 Poblacion
 Rosario
 San Luis (boundary of Cordon, Isabela)
 San Pablo
 Villa Aurora
 Villa Florentino

Climate

Demographics

Economy

Tilapia industry
On January 11, 2008, the Cagayan Bureau of Fisheries and Aquatic Resources (BFAR) stated that tilapia production grew and Cagayan Valley is now the Philippines’ tilapia capital. Production supply grew 37.25% since 2003, with 14,000 metric tons (MT) in 2007. The recent aquaculture congress found that the growth of tilapia production was due to government interventions: provision of fast-growing species, accreditation of private hatcheries to ensure supply of quality fingerlings, establishment of demonstration farms, providing free fingerlings to newly constructed fishponds, and the dissemination of tilapia to Nueva Vizcaya (in Diadi town). Former cycling champion Lupo Alava is a multi-awarded tilapia raiser in Bagabag, Nueva Vizcaya. Chairman Thompson Lantion of the Land Transportation Franchising and Regulatory Board, a retired two-star police general, has fishponds in La Torre, Bayombong, Nueva Vizcaya. Also, Nueva Vizcaya Gov. Luisa Lloren Cuaresma also entered into similar aquaculture endeavors in addition to tilapia production.

Government

Diadi, belonging to the lone congressional district of the province of Nueva Vizcaya, is governed by a mayor designated as its local chief executive and by a municipal council as its legislative body in accordance with the Local Government Code. The mayor, vice mayor, and the councilors are elected directly by the people through an election which is being held every three years.

Elected officials

Education
The Schools Division of Nueva Vizcaya governs the town's public education system. The division office is a field office of the DepEd in Cagayan Valley region. The office governs the public and private elementary and public and private high schools throughout the municipality.

References

External links

[ Philippine Standard Geographic Code]
Philippine Census Information
Local Governance Performance Management System

Municipalities of Nueva Vizcaya